The GT4 European Series is a sports car championship created and organised by SRO Motorsports Group. It is a pro/am championship which followed a formula similar to the FIA GT3 European Championship, which was itself derived from the FIA GT Championship which utilized the GT1 and GT2 classes. The GT4 class cars are the least powerful of the four classes, yet are equalised in order to allow driving skill to become key.

History
Following the successful introduction of the FIA GT3 European Championship in 2006, the formula was expanded to include usage by other nationally based professional championships such as the British GT Championship, Belcar, Australian GT Championship and German ADAC GT Masters. While the FIA GT3 European Championship continues, the SRO felt that a true amateur championship was needed in order to complement GT3 which allowed a certain level of professional driver to compete. Many national series also adopted the GT4 regulations as a lower class, and the European Cup eventually lacked the competitors needed to continue. During the 2016 24 Hours of Spa, the Stéphane Ratel Organisation (SRO) announced that the European Cup would be divided in 2 different series for 2017. They are called the GT4 European Series Northern Cup and the GT4 European Series Southern Cup. The Northern Cup will be the same as the European Cup, while the Southern Cup will collect forces with the FFSA GT Championship. Since Stéphane Ratel spoke out about his firm belief in this class, many championships and constructors have followed. In 2018 the Southern Cup was renamed FFSA GT - GT4 France, while the Northern Cup became the sole GT4 European Series again.

Vehicles
GT4 class cars are mostly what can be referred to as track day cars, which are factory-built race cars available to the public.  However, custom-built cars based on production models can also be built by teams.  All cars are test driven by the FIA and then modified so that they all have near identical performance levels.  Once a car has been approved by the FIA, it cannot be modified by the teams, eliminating continual development costs for constructors. All cars run on regulated Pirelli tires to further equalize performance.

The following cars are currently homologated for GT4:

Drivers
Like GT3, GT4 drivers have a set of criteria which would automatically eliminate them from competition based on their level of experience.  Since GT4 class drivers are meant to be true amateurs, these criteria are tighter than that seen in GT3.

Drivers under the age of 30 are not allowed to have had a top-ten finish in any national or international single-seater championship, nor to have had a distinguishable career in a national or international GT championship.  These drivers are known as Silver drivers.  Drivers over the age of 30 who did not receive their racing licenses until after turning 30 and having no single-seater experience at all are also allowed in the series, under the term Bronze drivers.

Races
Just as in GT3, each event would consist of two races of equal distance, usually held on different days.  Teams were not required to have two drivers and could use the same driver for each race.

Championship
The championship used the standard FIA point scheme for the top ten finishers: 25-18-15-12-10-8-6-4-2-1.  If a team used different drivers for each race in a single event, both drivers would receive points.  A driver and team championship were both held.

If at least five cars of the same make participate in a race, then a manufacturer cup would also be awarded, similar to the style used in GT3.

Champions

Drivers

Teams

Similar series
Since the introduction of the GT4 European Cup, the GT4 class of cars have been expanded to various national series.  The British GT Championship and Belgian GT Championship allow GT4 and Super Sport class cars to compete alongside the GT3 class, while the stand-alone Dutch GT4 Championship ran its first season of competition 2009. The Spanish GT Cup Open Europe series also allows GT4 cars to compete with one-make cars. A GT4 championship plans to be run in Brazil in 2010. Norway introduced a national championship called GTF in 2014 featuring GT4 regulated cars. The Super Taikyu Series in Japan also includes a GT4 class called ST-Z.  The United States-based ACCUS offers the GT4 America Series promoted by SRO and sanctioned by the United States Auto Club for one-hour sprint races, and the Michelin Pilot Challenge sanctioned by the International Motor Sports Association for longer races (2-4 hours).

References

External links

 
 
 Dutch GT4 Championship

 
GT4 (sports car class)
Sports car racing series
Recurring sporting events established in 2007